The Clover Bend High School is a historic community building on Arkansas Highway 228 in Clover Bend, Arkansas.  It is a single-story wood-frame structure, with a main central hip-roofed block, symmetrical side wings with gable roofs, and a rear projecting auditorium section.  It was built in 1937–38 with funding from the Farm Security Administration, with a number of additional buildings added to the complex in later years, including a gymnasium, elementary school, and administrator housing.  This complex formed the core of a major rural resettlement project, which included more than 90 farms.

The building was listed on the National Register of Historic Places in 1983.

See also
National Register of Historic Places listings in Lawrence County, Arkansas

References

School buildings on the National Register of Historic Places in Arkansas
School buildings completed in 1937
Buildings and structures in Lawrence County, Arkansas
National Register of Historic Places in Lawrence County, Arkansas
Historic district contributing properties in Arkansas